Daniel Grando (born 28 November 1985 in Pato Branco, Paraná) is a Brazilian striker .

Contract
23 January 2007 to 31 December 2009

References

External links
 sambafoot
 zerozero.pt
 CBF
 globoesporte
 globo.video
 Herói, Daniel Grando agradece apoio de Leão

1985 births
Living people
Brazilian footballers
Association football forwards
Sport Club Corinthians Paulista players